Tom Hardy is a retired American soccer defender who played professionally in the USL A-League.  He was the 1998 NAIA Player of the Year.

Hardy graduated from Roosevelt High School.  He attended Seattle University, where he was a 1997 Third Team and 1998 First Team NAIA All American as well as the 1998 NAIA Player of the Year.  In 1997, Hardy and his teammates won the NAIA national men's soccer championship.

On February 2, 1998, the Kansas City Wizards selected Hardy in the second round (twentieth overall) of the 1998 MLS Supplemental Draft, but was released during the pre-season.  In August 1998, Hardy signed with the Vancouver 86ers of the USL A-League and played two seasons with them.  In 1999, he nineteen games for Vancouver.  In February 2000, the New England Revolution selected Hardy in the sixth round of the 2000 MLS SuperDraft.

References

Living people
American soccer players
A-League (1995–2004) players
Vancouver Whitecaps (1986–2010) players
Sporting Kansas City draft picks
New England Revolution draft picks
Association football defenders
Year of birth missing (living people)